Komoča is a village and municipality in the Nové Zámky District in the Nitra Region of south-west Slovakia.

Geography
The village lies at an altitude of 110 metres and covers an area of 13.476 km.

History
In historical records the village was first mentioned in 1416.
After the Austro-Hungarian army disintegrated in November 1918, Czechoslovak troops occupied the area, later acknowledged internationally by the Treaty of Trianon. Between 1938and 1945 Komoča once more  became part of Miklós Horthy's Hungary through the First Vienna Award. From 1945 until the Velvet Divorce, it was part of Czechoslovakia. Since then it has been part of Slovakia.

Population
It has a population of about 918 people. The ethnic composition of the population is about 75% Hungarian and 25% Slovak.

Facilities
The village has a public library a swimming pool and a football pitch.

Genealogical resources

The records for genealogical research are available at the state archive "Statny Archiv in Bratislava, Nitra, Slovakia"

 Roman Catholic church records (births/marriages/deaths): 1796-1895 (parish B)
 Reformated church records (births/marriages/deaths): 1711-1897 (parish A)

See also
 List of municipalities and towns in Slovakia

References

External links
https://web.archive.org/web/20080111223415/http://www.statistics.sk/mosmis/eng/run.html 
Komoča – Nové Zámky Okolie
Surnames of living people in Komoca

Villages and municipalities in Nové Zámky District
Hungarian communities in Slovakia